This is the discography of record producer Mike Hedges.

Discography

Compilation albums

Soundtrack mixing

Notes

References 

Production discographies